The Heart of a Nation is a 1943 French drama film directed by Julien Duvivier who co-wrote screenplay with Marcel Achard and Charles Spaak. The film stars Raimu, Michèle Morgan and Louis Jouvet.

Plot

The film follows a family in Montmartre from the Franco-Prussian War to World War II.

An American release featured an introduction by Charles Boyer and scenes of the German entry into Paris.

Principal cast
Raimu as L'oncle Jules Froment 
Michèle Morgan as Marie Froment-Léonard 
Louis Jouvet as Pierre Froment / Félix Froment 
Suzy Prim as Estelle Froment adulte 
Renée Devillers as Gabrielle Froment
Louis Jourdan as Christian (uncredited)

Production
Louis Jourdan played the on screen brother of his real life brother, Pierre.

Filming started in late 1939 but was interrupted by the war.

Release
The film was released in New York before France.

On January 25, 2005, the American version of the film that is dubbed into English and features a prologue by Charles Boyer was released by Alpha Video on DVD .

References

External links
The Heart of a Nation at Rotten Tomatoes
Untel père et fils at DvdToile

Films directed by Julien Duvivier
1943 films
French historical drama films
1940s historical drama films
Films set in the 19th century
1940s French-language films
French black-and-white films
1943 drama films
1940s French films

World War II films made in wartime